The Russian Guild of Film Critics is a Russian organization of professional film critics, headquartered in Moscow.  Beginning in 1998, the guild began conferring annual awards in several categories. The awards were called the "Golden Ram" or "Golden Aries" from 1998 to 2004, then, beginning in 2005, the name was changed to "White Elephant".

The guild belongs to the Union of Cinematographers of the Russian Federation, a non-government organisation, and has been a member of FIPRESCI since 1999.

Award categories

Current categories

Best Film
Best Director
Best Actor
Best Actress
Best Supporting Actor
Best Supporting Actress

Best Screenplay
Best Cinematography
Best Art Direction
Best Music
Best Animated Film
Best Documentary

Best Short Film
Best First Film
Best Television Series
Lifetime Achievement Award
Event of the Year

Retired awards
Best Foreign Language Film  (awarded 1998–2011)
Best Foreign Actor (awarded 1998–2003)
Best Foreign Actress (awarded 1998–2003)

Award ceremonies

References

External links
  (in Russian) 
 RGOFC at IMDb

Film critics associations
Russian film awards
Organizations based in Moscow
Film organizations in Russia
Non-profit organizations based in Russia